Toradora! is an anime television series adapted from the light novel series of the same title written by Yuyuko Takemiya and illustrated by Yasu. The series was directed by Tatsuyuki Nagai and produced by J.C.Staff, Masayoshi Tanaka serving as the character designer and Mari Okada serving as the primary scriptwriter. The series follows Ryūji Takasu, a high school student whose eyes make him look like an intimidating delinquent, and Taiga Aisaka, a diminutive girl in his class who is known for her negative attitude towards nearly everyone. The two of them spend their days of high school with their three close friends named Minori Kushieda, Yūsaku Kitamura and Ami Kawashima.

Toradora! was broadcast on TV Tokyo from October 2, 2008 to March 26, 2009. It began airing at later dates than TV Tokyo on AT-X, TV Aichi, TV Hokkaido, TV Osaka, TV Setouchi, and TVQ Kyushu Broadcasting. King Records released the series in eight Region 2 DVD compilations between January 21, 2009, and August 26, 2009. The first DVD contained four episodes while the other seven DVDs contained three episodes each. Limited editions of all eight compilations, each containing a bonus CD, were also released. The second DVD contained an extra short, . A Blu-ray Disc collection containing an original video animation episode was released on December 21, 2011.

The series makes use of four pieces of theme music: two opening and two ending themes. The opening theme for the first 16 episodes is titled  performed by Rie Kugimiya, Eri Kitamura, and Yui Horie. The opening for the rest of the series is "Silky Heart" performed once again by Yui Horie, and the second ending is  performed by Rie Kugimiya, Eri Kitamura, and Horie. The original score for Toradora! was composed and arranged by Yukari Hashimoto. The soundtrack album was released on January 7, 2009.

Episode list

Toradora!

Toradora SOS! Hurray for Foodies
 is a collection of DVD exclusive mini-episodes featured on even numbered volume releases of the anime series. In these shorts, the cast are represented as chibis. Ryūji takes Taiga and Ami to the family diner to try out various foods, and he usually competes against Minori to see which dish is the best. There is a recurring gag in which Ryūji gets ignored when he gives boring trivial facts about the food. Moreover, Yūsaku declares each contest as a draw, but no one pays attention to him. Each episode ends with a segment titled "Today's Inko", in which Ryūji's pet bird Inko struggles to say something.

Volume DVDs
King Records released eight Region 2 DVD compilations, the first DVD containing four episodes and the other seven DVDs containing three episodes each, between January 21 and August 26, 2009. Volumes 2, 4, 6 and 8 feature an additional short entitled Toradora! SOS, in which chibi versions of the cast try out various foods. Limited editions of all eight compilations, each of which contains a bonus CD, were also released.

References

Toradora!
Toradora!